Orthophytum rubrum is a plant species in the genus Orthophytum.

The bromeliad is endemic to the Atlantic Forest biome (Mata Atlantica Brasileira) in Bahia state, located in southeastern Brazil.

Cultivars
 × Neophytum 'Yum Yum|× Neophytum'' 'Yum Yum'

References

BSI Cultivar Registry Retrieved 11 October 2009

rubrum
Endemic flora of Brazil
Flora of Bahia
Flora of the Atlantic Forest